The Shaw School District was a public school district based in Shaw, Mississippi (USA). The district served the Bolivar County portion of the city; the small portion of the city that lies in Sunflower County was and is served by the Sunflower County School District. On July 1, 2014, the Shaw School District was consolidated into the West Bolivar Consolidated School District.

The district served Shaw and Skene.

The district operated two schools, Shaw High School and McEvans School (elementary-middle school).

History

In 2012 the Mississippi Legislature passed a bill that required five school districts in Bolivar County to consolidate into two larger ones. On July 1, 2014, the Shaw School District was consolidated into the West Bolivar Consolidated School District.

Demographics
The district had about 960 students sometime before or in 2003.

2006-07 school year
There were a total of 668 students enrolled in the Shaw School District during the 2006-2007 school year. The gender makeup of the district was 50% female and 50% male. The racial makeup of the district was 98.65% African American, 0.60% White, and 0.75% Hispanic. 95.2% of the district's students were eligible to receive free lunch.

Previous school years

Accountability statistics

See also

List of school districts in Mississippi

References

Further reading
Map of Bolivar County School Districts as of 2010 - U.S. Census Bureau
Legislation from the Mississippi Legislature requiring the Bolivar County school district consolidations
Ruling from the  U.S. Department of Justice about the Bolivar County school district consolidations

External links
 (shawschools.k12.ms.us)
 (www2.mde.k12.ms.us/0615

Education in Bolivar County, Mississippi
Former school districts in Mississippi
2014 disestablishments in Mississippi
School districts disestablished in 2014